Tapes is a municipality in Rio Grande do Sul state, Brazil, near to Porto Alegre. It is good for sailing, windsurfing, kitesurfing.

References

Municipalities in Rio Grande do Sul